The discography of The Feeling, a British band, consists of six studio albums and twenty two singles.

Their debut album, Twelve Stops and Home was released in 2006, and reached number 2 on the UK Albums Chart. The album produced five top-forty singles. Their second album, Join with Us, produced four singles and reached number 1 on the UK Albums Chart. Their third album Together We Were Made reached number 22, but did not produce any singles in the top 100 of the UK Singles Chart. The Feeling's fourth studio album Boy Cried Wolf reached number 33 on the UK Albums chart. The band released their self-titled fifth album in March 2016. Predominantly during the Covid-19 2020 lockdowns in London, they recorded and self-produced their sixth studio album Loss. Hope. Love to be released early May 2022. In September 2021, as a taster for the new album, they released their version of "This Was Me", which Dan Gillespie Sells wrote for the film adaptation of the West End musical Everybody's Talking About Jamie.

Albums

Studio albums

Compilation albums

Extended plays

Singles

Video releases

Music videos

Other contributions
The Acoustic Album (2006) – "Sewn"
The Saturday Sessions: The Dermot O'Leary Show (2007) – "Walk Like an Egyptian"
Radio One Established 1967 (2007) – "You're So Vain"
Radio One Live Lounge Volume 3 (2008) – "Work"
Island Life: 50 Years of Island Life (2009) – "Never Be Lonely"
1969 Key to Change (2010) – "In the Year 2525"

References

Discographies of British artists
Pop music group discographies